Identical is Ellen Hopkins's fifth novel. The book was released in August 2008 and hit The New York Times Bestsellers list. Hopkins has stated that "Some of the material for the book came from friends, friends who are now strong successful women and you would never guess that abuse is in their past".

Plot 
From the bookjacket

"Kaeleigh and Raeanne are 16-year-old identical twins, the daughters of a district court judge father and politician mother running for Congress. Everything on the surface of their lives seems Norman Rockwell perfect, but underneath run deep and damaging secrets.

Kaeleigh is the good girl-her father's perfect flower, something she has tried so hard to be since she was nine and he started sexually abusing her. She cuts herself and binge eats, desperate to feel something normal. Raeanne uses painkillers, drugs, alcohol, sex, and purging as an outlet to numb the pain of not being Daddy's favorite. Both girls must figure out how to become whole, but how can they when their world has been torn to shreds?"

Reception
Reception for Identical has been positive, with the School Library Journal writing that the book was "Gritty and compelling, this is not a comfortable read, but its keen insights make it hard to put down." Publishers Weekly and Kirkus Reviews also positively reviewed the book, with Kirkus praising the book's voices as well as Hopkins's "masterful shards of verse".

In 2009, Identical was named the fifth most popular book for teens via YALSA's 2009 Teens’ Top Ten award.

References

External links

2008 American novels
Novels by Ellen Hopkins
Verse novels
American young adult novels
Margaret K. McElderry books